Bos Swallet is a karst cave in Burrington Combe on the Mendip Hills in Somerset, England.

The cave was first discovered by schoolboys from the nearby Sidcot School in mid-1947, where they noticed the presence of "bone, flints, and pottery" which was later the site of archeological investigation, and multiple attempts to dig out the cave from 1985 to 1995 which turned up with minimal results.

See also 
 Caves of the Mendip Hills

References 

Caves of the Mendip Hills
Limestone caves